The 1964 Denver Broncos season was the fifth season for the team in the American Football League (AFL). For the second straight season, they finished with a record of two wins, eleven losses, and one tie, and finished last in the AFL's Western Division.

In March 1964, the Chicago Sun-Times reported that then Chicago White Sox owner Arthur Allyn, Jr. planned to purchase the Broncos and move the franchise to Chicago where they would play at Comiskey Park. Both Allyn and Broncos president Cal Kunz denied the deal and the Broncos remained in Denver.

Personnel

Staff

Roster

Regular season

Standings

References

External links 
 1964 Denver Broncos at Pro-Football-Reference.com

Denver Broncos seasons
Denver Broncos
1964 in sports in Colorado